Łukasz Jarosiewicz (born 8 August 1981 in Poland) is a Polish retired footballer who is last known to have played for SV Harkebrügge in Germany.

Career
Jarosiewicz started his senior career with Jantar Ustka. In 2003, he signed for Polonia Warsaw in the Polish Ekstraklasa, where he made fifty-five appearances and scored ten goals. After that, he played for Polish club Znicz Pruszków, English club AFC Fylde, Greek club PAS Lamia 1964, Polish clubs Pomorze Potęgowo, Kolejarz Stróże, and Gwardia Koszalin, Scottish clubs Huntly and Formartine United, English club A.F.C. Blackpool, Polish clubs Saturn Mielno and Darłovia Darłowo, and German club SV Harkebrügge before retiring.

References

1981 births
Living people
Polonia Warsaw players
PAS Lamia 1964 players
Polish footballers
Polish expatriate footballers
Expatriate footballers in England
Expatriate footballers in Germany
Expatriate footballers in Greece
Expatriate footballers in Scotland
A.F.C. Blackpool players
AFC Fylde players
Formartine United F.C. players
Gwardia Koszalin players
Znicz Pruszków players
Kolejarz Stróże players
Huntly F.C. players
Association football forwards
Association football midfielders